Tõnu Oja (born 4 July 1958 in Tallinn) is an Estonian actor.

In 1980 he graduated from Estonian Academy of Music and Theatre. Since 2003 he has worked at the Estonian Drama Theatre. He has also played in films.

His elder brother is actor and director Rein Oja and his sons are actor Pääru Oja and deputy mayor Kaarel Oja, who has three children: Elo-Mirt (14), Jaakob Eik (11) and Laurits (6).

Selected filmography
 Sügis (1990)
 Täna öösel me ei maga (2004)
 Revolution of Pigs (2004)
 August 1991 (2005, television film)
 Lotte from Gadgetville (2006, voice)
 Tuulepealne maa (2009, television miniseries) 
 Letters to Angel (2010)
 Lotte and the Moonstone Secret (2011, voice)
 A Friend of Mine (2011)
 Elavad pildid (2013) 
 O2 (2020)

References

External links

Living people
1958 births
Estonian male stage actors
Estonian male film actors
Estonian male voice actors
Estonian male television actors
20th-century Estonian male actors
21st-century Estonian male actors
Recipients of the Order of the White Star, 4th Class
Estonian Academy of Music and Theatre alumni
Male actors from Tallinn